Anton Toolanen (born January 26, 1997) is a Swedish ice hockey player. He is currently playing with Luleå HF of the Swedish Hockey League (SHL).
Toolanen made his Swedish Hockey League debut playing with Luleå HF during the 2014–15 SHL season.

References

External links

1997 births
Living people
Luleå HF players
Swedish ice hockey forwards